Amit Varma  is an Indian television actor, best known for his role as Vishwamitra (aka Vish) Kelkar on the television show Hotel Kingston on Star One (Life Ok). He has played the role of a protagonist on  four television shows and a film (Detective Nani). He has also acted as an antagonist in the film Kismat Konnection, opposite Vidya Balan.

Early life 
Varma was born and brought up in Mumbai. He attended Don Bosco School in Matunga and HMPS later in his school-life when he moved to Andheri. He has earned a B.A. degree from Mithibai College in Mumbai.

Career 
Varma started his career as a stage actor. He participated in famous shows like Tash ke Patte, directed by Kader Khan. Later he decided to move on to modeling and Birla gave him his first break. After doing few more ads like Lifebuoy, VIP, Airtel and Close up, he got his first break on television in the comic show Khichdi on Star One for the character of Raju. However, it wasn't until a few more years that he was fully noticed, and finally got the role of Vish in Hotel Kingston, his first television show as a lead actor. This show not only brought him fame but it also created a "chocolate-boy image" of him, which is being associated with him till date. The actor made his debut in Tinsel town in 2008 with the movie Kismat Konnection, produced by Aziz Mirza, also starring Bollywood actors Shahid Kapoor, Vidya Balan and Juhi Chawla. He was last seen in a Telefilm with Star Plus, Teri Meri Love Stories in 2012, where he played a Geek for PLaytime Creations (Paresh Rawal).

Filmography

Television

Films

Episodics

Music videos

See also
Rupali Bhosale
Surjit Saha
Sumeet Raghavan
Vinay Rohrra

References

External links

1978 births
Living people
Male actors from Mumbai
Male actors in Hindi cinema
Indian male film actors
Indian male stage actors
Indian male television actors
Indian male soap opera actors
Indian male models
Don Bosco schools alumni
Actors from Mumbai